Epsilon photography is a form of computational photography wherein multiple images are captured with slightly varying camera parameters (each image varying the parameter by a small amount ε, hence the name) such as aperture, exposure, focus, film speed and viewpoint for the purpose of enhanced post-capture flexibility. The term was coined by Prof. Ramesh Raskar. The technique has been developed as an alternative to light field photography that requires no specialized equipment. Examples of epsilon photography include focal stack photography, High dynamic range (HDR) photography, lucky imaging, multi-image panorama stitching and confocal stereo. The common thread for all the aforementioned imaging techniques is that multiple images are captured in order to produce a composite image of higher quality, such as richer color information, wider-field of view, more accurate depth map, less noise/blur and greater resolution. 

Since Epsilon photography at times may require the capture of hundreds of images, recently an alternative called Compressive Epsilon Photography was proposed where one captures only a select few images instead and generates the rest of the images of the stack by making use of prior information about the scene or relationship among the images in the stack. The reconstructed stack of images can be used as before for novel photography applications such as light field recovery, depth estimation, refocusing and synthetic aperture photography.

Sources

See also
 Computational photography

Digital photography
Image processing